Gekko subpalmatus is a species of gecko. It is endemic to China.

References

Gekko
Reptiles of China
Endemic fauna of China
Reptiles described in 1864
Taxa named by Albert Günther